Sword and Scale is a bi-weekly American podcast exploring nonfiction stories of true crime. It features a variety of narrated true crime stories intertwined with interviews with criminals, witnesses, victims, authors, 911 call audio, witness testimony, trial audio, interrogation tapes, music, and sound effects. The podcast was first released on January 1, 2014 by creator, host, Mike Boudet.

Within a year, Sword and Scale had 1 million downloads and it has ranked in the top 10 of the iTunes "Science" category, and within the top 5 in the "Social Sciences" category. Popularity increased dramatically after the popularity of Serial, and the show is often compared to it and other podcasts like Criminal. In 2016, Sword and Scale became part of the Wondery podcast network started by former Fox International Channels CEO Hernan Lopez.

The show returned for its eighth season in January 2021.

Controversy

Wondery officially parted ways with Sword and Scale on March 9, 2019 after Boudet, the podcast's host, shared a statement on the official Instagram account that drew online criticism over its perceived misogynistic nature.

Following its departure from Wondery, Tricia Griffith, veteran broadcaster and owner of the popular true crime forum Websleuths, was appointed the show's new host. The move was temporary, with Mike Boudet returning on June 12, 2019.

On 1 April 2021, Sword & Scale announced on their social media pages that Kast Media had voided the show’s contract. 

On 11 November 2021, Mike Boudet announced the immediate closure of all Sword & Scale's social media pages via a post on his blog. As at December 2022, all Sword & Scale social media pages are active. 

In December 2022, the Sword & Scale Twitter account faced backlash after tweeting an insensitive poll asking people to vote on which race they preferred victims to be. All tweets relating to this have since been deleted from the Sword & Scale Twitter account.

References

External links
 

Infotainment
Audio podcasts
2014 podcast debuts
Crime podcasts